David John Ames (born 1954) is an Australian psychiatrist and academic. In addition to being Emeritus Professor in the Department of Psychiatry at the University of Melbourne, he is a part-time consultant psychiatrist at a number of hospitals in Melbourne, a professorial fellow with The National Ageing Research Institute and a research fellow at the Howard Florey Institute. Over his career, Ames has written over 56 book chapters, edited 22 books, and has published over 300 articles in peer-reviewed journals. Ames' main research and clinical interests have been the detection and management of Alzheimer's disease (AD), new therapies for AD, and the care of the depressed elderly.

In 2018, Ames was made an Officer of the General Division of the Order of Australia (AO) in the 2018 Australia Day Honours, for distinguished service to psychiatry, particularly in the area of dementia and the mental health of older persons, as an academic, author and practitioner, and as an adviser to professional bodies.

Education
Ames graduated with honours in Medicine and Obstetrics & Gynaecology (MBBS) in 1978 from the University of Melbourne, where he was awarded the Upjohn prize for Clinical Pharmacology and Therapeutics.

After completing his internship and junior resident medical officer experience at the Royal Melbourne Hospital between 1979–1981, Ames trained in psychiatry at the Royal Melbourne Hospital. Moving to London in 1984 he continued his training in psychiatry at the Friern Hospital. In 1985 Ames was appointed to a position as an honorary lecturer and research fellow at the Royal Free Hospital.

After returning to Melbourne, Ames continued his educational pursuits at the University of Melbourne. In 1989 he then completed his doctoral thesis on "depression in residential homes for the elderly" obtaining his Doctor of Medicine (MD) in 1987. In 1993 he also completed a part-time Bachelor of Arts (BA) with a major in (Medieval) history.

Works

AIBL study 
Australian Imaging, Biomarkers and Lifestyle Study of Ageing, started in 2006, is a study of over 1,100 people assessed over a long period of time ( > 4.5 years) to determine which biomarkers, cognitive characteristics, and health and lifestyle factors determine subsequent development of symptomatic Alzheimer's Disease. With Australia's ageing population, the number of people suffering from dementia is expected to rise from 245,400 (1.1% of population) in 2009 to 1.13 million (3.2% of projected population) by 2050. It is one of the fastest growing sources of major disease burden, overtaking coronary heart disease in total well being cost by 2023.

Selected books authored and edited

Awards and honors
Officer (AO) in the General Division of the Order of Australia (2018)
College Citation from Royal Australian and New Zealand College of Psychiatrists (2017)
Recipient, Certificate of Outstanding Teaching, Joint Master of Psychological Medicine and Master of Psychiatry (2012)
Fellow of the Australian Association of Gerontology (2001)
Fellow of the Royal College of Psychiatrists (1997)
Fellow of the Royal Australian and New Zealand College of Psychiatrists (1989)
Upjohn prize for Clinical Pharmacology and Therapeutics (1978)

References

External links

Presentations 
 2016 – University of Melbourne – New(ish) developments in dementia treatments – Presentation
 2014 – NARI Annual Seminar – The Underlying causes of most dementia – Presentation Part 1, Part 1b, Part 2
 2011 – University of New Mexico Lecture – Alzheimer's Disease: Why it Matters to All of Us – Video, Questions and Answers
 2008 – University of Melbourne – Alzheimer's Disease: Predictors and Early Intervention – Audio

Related websites 
Australian Imaging, Biomarker & Lifestyle Flagship Study of Ageing

Australian medical researchers
Australia Prize recipients
Living people
Officers of the Order of Australia
Psychiatrists from Melbourne
University of Melbourne alumni
Academic staff of the University of Melbourne
1954 births